AOC International (trading as AOC, formerly Admiral Overseas Corporation) is a multinational electronics company headquartered in Taipei, Taiwan, and a subsidiary of TPV Technology. It designs and produces a full range of LCD TVs and PC monitors, and formerly CRT monitors for PCs which are sold worldwide under the AOC brand.

History

 

Admiral Overseas Corporation (AOC) was founded in Chicago, Illinois, by Ross Siragusa as the Asian arm of his Admiral Corporation, and later established in Taiwan in 1967 as the first manufacturer of colour televisions for export. In 1978, Admiral Overseas Corporation was renamed AOC International. Direct marketing under the AOC brand name began in 1979.  From 1988 to 1997, AOC established its sales offices in United States, China, Europe, and Brazil. AOC was launched in India and Mexico in 2005 and 2006 respectively. Today, AOC products including CRT and LCD monitors, LCD television sets, all-in-one units and Android tablets, are available in more than 40 countries worldwide.

Timeline

 1934 – Continental Radio and Television Corporation founded in Chicago, Illinois by Ross Siragusa. Name would later be changed to Admiral Corporation.
 1947 – Admiral company and brand established in the United States; it is one of the first companies to produce color television sets.
 1951 – Admiral sells over 5 million television sets.
 1967 – Admiral Overseas Corporation (AOC) established in Taiwan; first manufacturer of color television sets for export.
 1978 – Admiral Overseas Corporation renamed to AOC International.
 1979 – AOC starts direct marketing under its own brand name.
 1982 – AOC brand registered worldwide.
 1988 to 1997 – AOC establishes sales offices in the United States, China, Europe, and Brazil; main focus is computer monitors.
 1999 to 2001 – AOC enters the display market in New Zealand and Australia.
 2005 – AOC launched in India.
 2006 – AOC launched in Mexico.
 2007 to 2009 – AOC sells in more than 40 countries worldwide; products include CRT and LCD monitors, LCD TVs, and all-in-one PCs.
 2014 – Dedicated gaming line launches; One of the industry’s most extensive product portfolio.
 2016 - AOC launches its AGON by AOC premium line of gaming monitors.
 2017 – Celebrating 50 years of AOC; Currently sold in 55 countries; Market leader in 10 countries.
 2020 – AOC is the number one gaming monitor brand in the world and fourth monitor brand overall.
 2021 – IDC Quarterly Gaming Tracker - #1 Gaming Monitor 2021; AOC expands the portfolio with accessories.
 2022 – IDC Quarterly Gaming Tracker - #1 Gaming Monitor 2022.

Awards

2005 
 AOC was ranked 82nd in Info 200 Company - Top 200 in the technology category in Brazil.

2006 
 AOC was ranked 59th in Info 200 Company - Top 200 in the technology category in Brazil.

2007 
 AOC ranked Top 3 in monitor category in the "2007 Best Brands Survey" by PC World in Brazil.
 AOC received the "Fast-growing company in LCD monitors market" award from CCID Consulting in China.
 Several awards were conferred to AOC products in India by Digit & Chip magazines.

2008 
 AOC was ranked 33 of Global Top 50 CE Brands by IDG in CES Daily magazine in 2008.
 AOC received the Consumers' Brand of Choice from the China Computer Users Association.
 AOC received Best in Hardware IT Monitors (Top 100 IT & Telecom, IDG ComputerWorld Magazine) in Brazil.
 AOC has won the Red Dot Design Award.
 Several awards were conferred to AOC products in India by Digit & Chip magazines.

2009 
 AOC was awarded as Power Brand Malaysia 2009 by the Global CEO Magazine.

See also
 List of companies of Taiwan

References

External links

 

Companies listed on the Hong Kong Stock Exchange
Companies based in Taipei
Display technology companies
Taiwanese brands
Electronics companies of Taiwan
Electronics companies established in 1967
1967 establishments in Taiwan